Gabriel da Silva Santos (born 4 May 1996) is a Brazilian swimmer. He competed in the men's 4 × 100 metre freestyle relay event at the 2016 Summer Olympics, finishing 5th.

Biography
At the 2017 World Aquatics Championships in Budapest, in the Men's 4 × 100 metre freestyle relay, 
the Brazilian team composed of Santos, César Cielo, Bruno Fratus and Marcelo Chierighini achieved a historic result by winning the silver medal, the best Brazilian result of all time at the World Championships in this race. Brazil beat the South American record of 2009, still in the super-suits era, with a time of 3:10.34, just 0.28 from the US team. The last medal of Brazil in this race, in Worlds, was obtained in 1994. He also finished 14th in the Men's 100 metre freestyle.

At the 2018 Pan Pacific Swimming Championships in Tokyo, Japan, he won the gold medal in the Men's 4 × 100 metre freestyle relay, along with Marcelo Chierighini, Marco Ferreira Júnior and Pedro Spajari. He also finished 12th in the Men's 100 metre freestyle and 12th in the Men's 50 metre freestyle.

Santos was found guilty of an anti-doping rule violation from 20 May 2019 by FINA, who attempted to impose a 12-month suspension on him, which was followed up with an investigation by the Court of Arbitration for Sport who overturned the FINA suspension and ruled Santos, not at fault nor negligent in his committing the anti-doping rule violation. This anti-doping rule violation by Santos resulted in his being indefinitely banned from competing in the International Swimming League.

In June 2021, he qualified to represent Brazil at the 2020 Summer Olympics.

References

External links
 

1996 births
Living people
Olympic swimmers of Brazil
Swimmers at the 2016 Summer Olympics
Swimmers at the 2020 Summer Olympics
Place of birth missing (living people)
World Aquatics Championships medalists in swimming
Brazilian male freestyle swimmers
People from Guarulhos
Sportspeople from São Paulo (state)
20th-century Brazilian people
21st-century Brazilian people
Competitors at the 2022 South American Games
South American Games gold medalists for Brazil
South American Games bronze medalists for Brazil
South American Games medalists in swimming